Conchas Dam is a census-designated place in San Miguel County, New Mexico, United States. As of the 2010 census, its population was 186.

It includes the Conchas Dam Historic District, which is listed on the National Register of Historic Places.  All this is on the Canadian River.

Demographics

References

Census-designated places in San Miguel County, New Mexico
Census-designated places in New Mexico